Bill Donaldson (26 October 1923 – 8 August 1999) was an Australian cricketer. He played twenty first-class matches for New South Wales between 1945/46 and 1949/50.

See also
 List of New South Wales representative cricketers

References

External links
 

1923 births
1999 deaths
Australian cricketers
New South Wales cricketers
Cricketers from Sydney